There have been several baronetcies created for people with the surname Dalrymple.

Creations
All creations were in the Baronetage of Nova Scotia unless otherwise mentioned.

The first creation was on 2 June 1664, for James Dalrymple of Stair. He was later created Viscount of Stair in 1690, and the titles remain merged.

The second creation was on 28 April 1698, for James Dalrymple, second son of the first Viscount of Stair. The fifth baronet, Sir John, succeeded as eighth Earl of Stair (and ninth baronet of the 1664 creation) in 1840, and the titles remain merged.

The third creation was on 29 April 1698, for Hew Dalrymple, third son of the first Viscount of Stair abovementioned. For more information on this creation, see Hamilton-Dalrymple baronets.

The fourth creation was on 8 May 1701, for David Dalrymple, fifth son of the first Viscount of Stair. This title became extinct (or dormant) on the death of the fifth baronet, Sir John, on 17 October 1829.

The fifth creation was on 6 March 1815, in the Baronetage of the United Kingdom, for Hew Whitefoord Dalrymple, eldest son of John Dalrymple and grandson of Sir Hew Dalrymple, first baronet of the 1697 creation. This title became extinct on the death of his son Sir Adolphus, 2nd Baronet, on 3 March 1866.

The sixth creation was on 19 July 1887, in the Baronetage of the United Kingdom, for Charles Dalrymple (previously Fergusson), second son of Sir Charles Dalrymple Fergusson, 5th Baronet, and grandson of Sir James Fergusson, 4th Baronet and his wife Jean Dalrymple, who was the daughter of Sir David Dalrymple, third baronet of the 1701 creation. This title became extinct on the death of the third baronet, Sir Mark, 29 June 1971.

Dalrymple baronets, of Stair (1664)
Sir James Dalrymple, 1st Baronet (1619–1695), created Viscount of Stair in 1690
see Viscount of Stair for subsequent holders

Dalrymple baronets, of Cranstoun (1698)
Sir James Dalrymple, 1st Baronet (1650–1719)
Sir John Dalrymple, 2nd Baronet (1682–1743)
Sir William Dalrymple, 3rd Baronet (1704–1771)
Sir John Dalrymple Hamilton, 4th Baronet (1726–1810)
Sir John Hamilton Dalrymple, 5th Baronet (1771–1853), succeeded as 8th Earl of Stair in 1840
see Earl of Stair for subsequent holders

Dalrymple baronets, of Bargeny (1698)
see Hamilton-Dalrymple baronets

Dalrymple baronets, of Hailes, Midlothian (1701)
Sir David Dalrymple, 1st Baronet (1665–1721)
Sir James Dalrymple, 2nd Baronet (1692–1751), Principal Auditor of the Exchequer in Scotland
Sir David Dalrymple, 3rd Baronet (1726–1792)
Sir James Dalrymple, 4th Baronet (died 1800)
Sir John Pringle Dalrymple, 5th Baronet (died 1829)

Dalrymple baronets, of High Mark (1815 UK)
Sir Hew Whitefoord Dalrymple, 1st Baronet (died 1830)
Sir Adolphus John Dalrymple, 2nd Baronet (1784–1866) MP for Haddington Burghs 1826–31 and 1831–32

Dalrymple baronets, of New Hailes (1887 UK)
Sir Charles Dalrymple, 1st Baronet (1839–1916)
Sir David Charles Herbert Dalrymple, 2nd Baronet (1879–1932)
Sir Charles Mark Dalrymple, 3rd Baronet (1915–1971) last of the line

References

Baronetcies in the Baronetage of Nova Scotia
Extinct baronetcies in the Baronetage of the United Kingdom
1664 establishments in Nova Scotia
1815 establishments in the United Kingdom